John Gabriel Cummins (born 29 December 1944) is a former South Australian politician who represented the South Australian House of Assembly seat of Norwood from 1993 to 1997 for the Liberal Party.

References

Members of the South Australian House of Assembly
1944 births
Living people
Liberal Party of Australia members of the Parliament of South Australia